Włatcy móch (English: The Lordz o' Flys) is a Polish adult animated series, which had been on the Polish TV channel TV4 between November 2006 and December 2011. The title is a misspelled version of "Władcy much" meaning "The Lords of Flies" and derives from William Golding's novel Lord of the Flies. The plot of the story revolves around four 8-year-old boys in the second grade of elementary school: Anusiak, Konieczko, Maślana and Czesio.  The show has a total of 127 regular and 2 special episodes. There is also a feature movie. The comedy won the 2008  in category "TV Series".

It is often compared with South Park (it has even been nicknamed as "Polish South Park").

Reportedly, an English version aired on Paramount Comedy 1 (Later known as Comedy Central) in the UK in 2007.

Main characters
 Czesio - is a zombie. He lives with two friends, Marcel and The Colonel and also has a teddy bear - Sweary. He wants to become a singer of Gorzkie żale (in Czesio's meaning, old, sad Church chants).  Czesio had such serious and numerous developmental and genetic disabilities before death, that it was only after he died, he was able to function normally. He doesn't know that he's a living dead and because of that, he is physically unable to grow up. He's extremely polite and kind, but also very naïve. He can eat everything without harm, without limits in quantity. His IQ was estimated at 70.
 Anusiak - (in the episode "Nazywam się Anusiak", he's also called Odbyciak - odbyt is Polish for anus). He always sniffs his hand after the end of most of his sentences because he has allergies.  His father is a member of a peasant political party (probably Samoobrona) and is a Sejm member - which is reflected in Anusiak's political aspirations. He wants to create a large populist party that would one day rule the world, with himself as the leader. Due to his fathers' example, he is skilled at writing and delivering appealing (populist) speeches. He always receives socks as his Christmas present. His IQ was estimated at 50.
 Maślana - (Buttermilk) sometimes called Moczowód (Polish for ureter) the richest and most cunning and sneaky of the group. He wants to be the President of the World Bank. He wore a diaper in the episode Mokre Sny ("Wet Dreams"). On his 8th birthday, his wealthy parents gave him a golden credit card. His top rated value is money, but he is also quite religious at the same time, and is very afraid of the Satan. His IQ was estimated at 130.
 Konieczko - (Necessary) a genius, similar to Dexter. He likes to experiment on animals, especially using explosives. He claims to be an Atheist. He wants to become the President of the Nobel Foundation. His IQ was estimated 153 - the highest in his class. He is confirmed to have ADHD.
 Ms. Frał - (the name Frał comes from the German die Frau, meaning woman, lady). Also called "the old bag" or "Gal/Dudette" by the main four. She is the teacher of class IIB, the classroom for the four boys. She is an old spinster and is still a virgin. Religiously devoted (in a very old-fashioned sense), she is very demanding and does not like the main characters, and does not refrain from insulting them frequently. She also speaks with an Eastern Polish accent.
 Mrs. Nurse - a corpulent school nurse with a deep, masculine voice. After the death of Marcel, her husband, she becomes interested in blues, but she is also interested and prolific in practically every kind of music. She also enjoys the reggae culture and smokes marijuana at times. In the episode "Behind the scenes", it is revealed she has an underage Asian lover.

Other characters
 Andżelika - is a classmate of the main characters. She came from the USA.  She is 3 years older than the other students, but attends the same class due to the educational differences between Poland and the USA. The boys don't like her mutually. In episode Andżelika, she was going out with Anusiak, Konieczko, and Maślana all at once, only to dump them the next day to go after Czesio. However, Czesio doesn't like her because she doesn't have a penis. Her IQ was estimated 140. Her father is from Texas. She often uses English words along with Polish.
 Karolina - Andżelika's best friend.
 Marcel - an alcoholic zombie, former husband of Mrs. Nurse. He committed suicide by jumping from the bridge, and therefore can't get into heaven. He lives at the cemetery and is the neighbor and friend of Czesio. He likes to spend his time with The Colonel on drinking beer and vodka brought on the cemetery by his wife, whom he told to do so instead of bringing flowers. Marcel often acts as Czesio's dad on parents' evenings.
 The Colonel - also a zombie, but with his upper skeleton and skull visible. He lives at the cemetery near Marcel, and another one of Czesio's friends.  He fought in the Home Army and, according to other information, in Józef Piłsudski's legion during World War I. He is known for his strong anticommunist views and dislike toward police. Some of his friends, fellow zombie Home Army veterans, are still living in an underground since the Warsaw uprising, where he visit them. Like Marcel, Colonel is an alcoholic and they often drink together. He often breaks into the graves of fallen Russians to get vodka. The Colonel often acts as Czesio's mum on parents' evenings.
 Sweary the Bear - Czesio's brown teddy filled with sawdust, leader of the plushies. Sweary is alive and swears a lot. He also helps Czesio when he is in trouble, along with the rest of the gang. He is also a drinkmate of Marcel and The Colonel, but does not drink too much because of soaking of this sawdust filling. Sweary is the only character in the show to be animated in 3D.
 The Homeless - sleeps rough and collects garbage. He mumbles a lot and never speaks intelligibly.
 The Bus Driver - a Satanist. He performs black Sabbaths at the cemetery. His IQ was estimated 66.6. It depressed Anusiak, because his IQ is even lower.
 The Priest - allergic to caffeine.  He is a dead ringer for Tadeusz Rydzyk.
 The Nun - a religious education teacher.  She looks and behaves exactly like Miss Frau, except she has a different accent.
 Mariola Wasilak - a TV journalist, who has won an Oscar for a report on Polish children at an annual potato lifting contest.
 Rambo - Maślana's dog, appears only in episode 34.
 Zajkowski - the main characters' classmate. He often visits the ladies room because the main characters hate him and often bully him (especially Anusiak). He has fallen in love with Andżelika. Anusiak always beats him up, and in one of the episodes, Konieczko killed him. His IQ was estimated 100.
 Pikulski and Frosik - are from sixth grade and they are around 4 years older than the main characters. They are school gangsters and the main characters are very afraid of them, in some episodes, they are always doing something mischievous to the main characters, such as stealing their property, or hitting them for fun. Surprisingly, Mrs. Nurse also hates them because she knows they are doing harm to other pupils, she will always help the main characters if Pikulski and Frosik have done wrong to them.
 Pedeciak - Konieczko's tan teddy with buttons in place of his eyes. Instead of his owner he's not very intelligent.
 Toothy - Maślana's teddy, wearing a blue-grey-red sweatshirt and a baseball cap. He has a single tooth going out of his mouth.
 Huggy - Anusiak's pink plush rabbit. He is the most infantile of the four plushies and wants to hug everyone, which annoys Sweary a lot.

List of episodes (titles from any mistakes)

Interesting sections of The ruler of flies
 The 32nd episode's title "Gigant" is ambiguous. Though the semantic meaning is simply "a giant", the term has an associative meaning in Polish slang wherein it signifies "a run-away". It is the latter that is most likely the intended meaning of the authors.
 The 66th episode's title is "Wioha" - it's a pejorative term for Village.
 The 76th episode's title is "Chjóston, ja pierdziu"; Chjóston does mean Houston, and "ja pierdziu" is milder form from "ja pierdole" (oh fuck!)
 The 77th episode's title is "Klasowa Wigilia". Wigilia in English is Christmas Eve, and "Klasowa" is "Class".
 The 90th episode's title - "Matka bosa" - is a pun on "Matka Boska" - Mother of God.
 In the 105 episode's title, the word "pierwiosnek" can be read as primrose, but it's also a pun from word "pierwiastek" - element.

Pronunciation
Many of the titles have intentional spelling mistakes in the Polish original, as Czesio is the narrator and has a tendency to misspell words. Though these are mostly there for comic effect, they do expose some interesting redundancies in the Polish spelling system, which is riddled with traditional forms of spelling that no longer have a phonological basis. One should keep in mind that though the shows spellings are regarded as incorrect by language purists, they often reflect the actual pronunciation of the words in question. Some examples include:

"Próhnica" instead of "Próchnica" (meaning "tooth decay") etc. The digraph "ch" represents a voiceless velar fricative whereas the graph "h" is an obsolete spelling from Old Polish that used to stand for a voiced glottal fricative; today, this form of pronunciation is present only is certain dialects of Polish, most notably the dialect of Podhale.

"Móch" instead of "Much" (which is the plural, genitive of "mucha", meaning "fly"). In Polish there are two graphemes that realise the close back rounded vowel phoneme; this is a remnant from Old Polish phonology, where the diacritic-o (ó) was used to express a long close mid rounded vowel. Today this spelling variation is obsolete.

Additionally, several spelling mistakes arise from devoicing, such as "krfawy" instead of "krwawy", or allophonic processes, as in "ałtobus" instead of "autobus"("ł" is presently pronounced as a glide vowel, similar to the English "w", though until the end of World War II it used to be a velarised alveolar liquid, or so called "dark-l"; this is still audible in various Polish black and white films from that time, during which the English "belt" and Polish "bełt", meaning "crossbow bolt", would be pronounced all but identically).

Most misspellings arise from true pronunciation, but some derive from hypercorrection, such as: "Memęto Mori" for "Memento mori".

Feature film
 - a 2009 animated feature-length movie

Włatcy Móch: One
From 2018, information about the return of the series began to appear. In March 2018, TV4 on the occasion of its 18th birthday made a promotional spot in which Czesio appears with a bear Przekliniak. On January 4, 2019 , the official website of the series was created on Facebook. On January 14, 2019 , a music video with the participation of the heroes of the series entitled: "Włatcy Móch: One - Dojrzywanie" appeared on the YouTube channel of Polsat TV. In August 2019, the 18th episode of the new series was leaked to the network , and a year later, the episode 19 with an unknown name, which had already been deleted, accidentally appeared on the network. At the end of March 2020. TV4 televisionon the occasion of its 20th birthday, it launched a special spot. In this spot there are images presenting programs. In the 19th second there is a picture of the Czech with the words "Włatcy móch One BIG BACK SUNDAY 20:00" and the station's logo, and in the 42nd second on the building on the right there is a caricature of the Czech. The TV4 station has not informed so far on which Sunday the first episode of the series will be broadcast.

Prizes

References

External links

2006 Polish television series debuts
2011 Polish television series endings
Polish adult animated comedy television series